Argenta is a bank based in Belgium that also operates in the Netherlands and Luxembourg. The Argenta headquarters are in Antwerp.

History
The Argenta Group has been active in Belgium since 1956 and in Luxemburg since 1987. It has been active on the Dutch mortgage market since 1997 and attracting savings in the Netherlands since 2004. All group activities exclusively consist of financial activities for families and individual clients relating to attracting savings, granting loans, distribution of collective investments and offering life and non-life insurance products. In 2021, Argenta reported to own and operate 348 ATMs.

Structure
Investeringsmaatschappij Argenta NV (abbreviated, Investar NV), a mixed financial holding of the Van Rompuy family, holds 86.81% of the shares in the Parent, with the remainder of the shares owned by Argenta Coöperatieve CVBA ("Argen-Co"), which is a recognised cooperative undertaking in accordance with the Act of 20 July 1955 on a National Council for Cooperatives. 
Argenta Bank- en Verzekeringsgroep nv is the holding company of the Argenta Group. Argenta Bank- en Verzekeringsgroep nv is a mixed financial holding within the meaning of article 3, 39° of the Banking Act. 
Argenta Spaarbank has one subsidiary, Argenta Asset Management S.A. Argenta Asset Management S.A. is a Luxembourg company which is responsible for the management and central administration of the Argenta Group's collective investment undertakings, i.e. Argenta Fund sicav and Argenta Fund of Funds sicav, which are open-end investment undertakings under Luxembourg law. The latter is a fund of funds (also known as an umbrella fund). This means that the assets of various sub-funds are invested in other collective investment undertakings.
In addition, Argenta Spaarbank has a branch office in the Netherlands.
Argenta Assuranties nv is a duly licensed Belgian insurance undertaking. Argenta Assuranties has one subsidiary, Argenta-Life Nederland N.V., an insurance undertaking organized under the laws of the Netherlands. It offers term life insurance linked to housing loans. It also manages a portfolio of mortgage insurance policies.

See also

Lists of banks
List of banks in Belgium

References

External links

argenta.nl
argenta.lu 
argentalife.lu

Banks established in 1956
Banks of Belgium
Companies based in Antwerp
Banks under direct supervision of the European Central Bank